Wen Boren; ca. (1502–1575) was a Chinese landscape painter during the Ming Dynasty (1368–1644).

Early life 
Wen was born in Changzhou (present day Wuxian of Jiangsu province). His style name was 'Du Cheng' (德承) and his pseudonyms were 'Wu Feng' (五峰), 'Bao Sheng' (葆生), and 'She Sheng Lao Nong' (摄山老农). He was the nephew of the famous painter Wen Zhengming.

Career
He was known as a landscape painter but he also painted figures. He belonged to the Wu School which painted in the style of the Yuan dynasty. The style of painting Boren used was known as Literati painting or ink wash. He worked out of the studio of his uncle Wen Zhengming; studying the works of the old masters.

One of his paintings titled "River Landscape with Towering Mountains" is housed at the Seattle Art Museum and it is a hanging scroll Ink and color on paper.

Personal life
The Wufeng Garden in Suzhou, China is named after five rocks within the garden The garden was built by Wen Boren and he had his home there.

References

1502 births
1575 deaths
Painters from Suzhou
Ming dynasty landscape painters